Dart Drug is a now-defunct chain of discount drug stores in the metropolitan Washington, DC region. It was founded in 1955, by Herbert Haft and his wife Gloria in Adams Morgan. The chain expanded to over 100 stores, and became a vehicle (as Dart Group) by which Herbert Haft engaged in greenmail activities against other public companies. It spun off Trak Auto and Crown Books. Dart Drug was sold to a management group in 1984,  bought by Bud Fantle in 1987 and renamed Fantle's, entered bankruptcy in 1989, and was eventually dissolved in 1990. The leases for Fantle's stores were acquired by competitors. 

Dart Group remained a viable company that was involved in a vicious family feud (see Herbert Haft for details).

The store's logo depicted a multicolored bullseye design with a triangular "dart" overlaid.

References
http://www.fundinguniverse.com/company-histories/dart-group-corporation-history/

Defunct pharmacies of the United States
Retail companies established in 1955
Defunct companies based in Washington, D.C.
Retail companies disestablished in 1990
Health care companies based in Washington D.C.
1955 establishments in Washington, D.C.